The Lac Qui Parle County Courthouse, located at 600 6th Street in Madison, Lac Qui Parle County in the U.S. state of Minnesota is a Richardsonian Romanesque style building featuring a high central tower, built in 1899 at a cost of $30,689.

Architects Buechner and Jacobson designed it and Olaf Swenson of Saint Paul built it.

The foundation is of river boulders; the outside walls are red brick with sandstone accents. The interior features oak cabinetry, stairways, doors, and paneling.  Floors are hardwood, except for the quarry tile in the hallways and marble treads on the stairs.

References

Buildings and structures in Lac qui Parle County, Minnesota
County courthouses in Minnesota
Courthouses on the National Register of Historic Places in Minnesota
Government buildings completed in 1899
Richardsonian Romanesque architecture in Minnesota
1899 establishments in Minnesota
National Register of Historic Places in Lac qui Parle County, Minnesota